Torshak is a village in Dustan Rural District, Badreh District, Darreh Shahr County, Ilam Province, Iran. At the 2006 census, its population was 24, in 4 families.

References 

Populated places in Darreh Shahr County